Hieronim Zoch (born 30 September 1990) is a Polish professional footballer who plays as a goalkeeper for Wigry Suwałki.

Career

Club
He made his Ekstraklasa debut against Korona Kielce on 14 May 2011.

On 4 August 2020 he returned to Wigry Suwałki.

References

External links
 

1990 births
People from Tczew
Sportspeople from Pomeranian Voivodeship
Living people
Polish footballers
Association football goalkeepers
Arka Gdynia players
Olimpia Elbląg players
Wigry Suwałki players
Siarka Tarnobrzeg players
Ekstraklasa players
I liga players
II liga players
III liga players